Elections to the seventh Odisha Legislative Assembly were held 1977.

Constituencies

The elections were held for 147 seats. A total of 604 candidates contested for these 147 seats.

Political Parties
In 1974, Utkal Congress merged into Bharatiya Lok Dal to form Odisha Janata Party. Odisha Janata Party includes Indian National Congress (O) – where "O" stood for "Organisation" or "Old", Samyukta Socialist Party and the Bharatiya Jana Sangh had formed a coalition called the "Grand Alliance" to oppose Indira Gandhi and the Congress (R) and the alliance was named as Janata Party.

Three national parties, Communist Party of India, Indian National Congress, and Janata Party took part in the assembly election.

Government 

The Janata Party emerged again as the winner by winning 78% of the seats with a vote share of 49%. Nilamani Routray become the Chief Minister of the state.

Results

Winning candidates

See also
 1977 elections in India
 1974 Odisha Legislative Assembly election
 1980 Odisha Legislative Assembly election

References

State Assembly elections in Odisha
Odisha
1970s in Orissa